Cazac may refer to:

 Constant amplitude zero autocorrelation waveform
 Cazac, Haute-Garonne, a commune in the arrondissement of Saint-Gaudens in Southern France